Peter Timothy Lynch (died 9 May 1967) was an Irish politician. He was an independent member of Seanad Éireann from 1938 to 1961. A farmer and auctioneer, he was first elected to the Seanad in 1938 by the Labour Panel. He was elected by the Agricultural Panel in 1943, and again by the Labour Panel in 1944. From 1948 onwards he was elected by the Industrial and Commercial Panel. He did not contest the 1961 Seanad election.

References

Year of birth missing
1967 deaths
Irish farmers
Members of the 3rd Seanad
Members of the 4th Seanad
Members of the 5th Seanad
Members of the 6th Seanad
Members of the 7th Seanad
Members of the 8th Seanad
Members of the 9th Seanad
Independent members of Seanad Éireann
People from Arigna